Spheniscus chilensis is an extinct species of penguin that lived during the Late Pliocene in Chile. The first fossil record of the penguin was discovered on the coast of Antofagasta in 1980, when coastal erosion exposed the first fossilized bone.

Discovery and naming
Spheniscus chilensis was discovered in 1980 at the site Cuenca del Tiburón near Antofagasta, Chile, which is part of the Late Pliocene Caleta Herradura Formation. This is the only locality from which it is known to occur. The fossil remains of S. chilensis consisted of dozens of disarticulated bones from different individuals that had eroded from a nearby rock formation. The specific name "Chilensis" references Chile, the country where it was discovered. See "Spheniscus" for the etymology of the generic name.

Description
The holotype consists of a complete left humerus and was one of the main features used to distinguish S. chilensis as a new species. The humerus has deep fossa at the proximal anconal surface below the head and a relatively small and narrow entepicondylar process, different from any living Spheniscus species. It also has a relatively slender shaft similar to S. magellanicus and S. demerus. The tarsometatarsus has shallow anterior grooves below the proximal foramina, different from all living Spheniscus. The ulna, radius, carpometatarsus and femur show only minor differences from living species of the genus.

In size and proportions S. chilensis is most similar to the living S. humboldti and S. magellanicus.

References

Fossils of Chile
†chilensis
Extinct penguins
Pliocene birds of South America
Fossil taxa described in 2003